The 1996 NAIA World Series was the 40th annual tournament hosted by the National Association of Intercollegiate Athletics to determine the national champion of baseball among its member colleges and universities in the United States and Canada.

The tournament was played for at Lewis and Clark Park in Sioux City, Iowa.

Lewis–Clark State (53–11) defeated Saint Ambrose (42–19) in a single-game championship series, 9–0, to win the Warriors' ninth NAIA World Series and first since 1992.

Lewis–Clark State first baseman Troy Silva was named tournament MVP.

Bracket

Preliminary

Championship

See also
 1996 NCAA Division I baseball tournament
 1996 NCAA Division II baseball tournament
 1996 NCAA Division III baseball tournament
 1996 NAIA Softball World Series

Reference

NAIA World Series
NAIA World Series
NAIA World Series
NAIA World Series